Multivalvulida is an order of myxozoan.

Families
 Kudoidae
 Spinavaculidae
 Trilosporidae

References
Encyclopedia of Life entry

Myxosporea
 
Cnidarian orders